Kohlrosing (a.k.a. Kolrosing) is the Scandinavian tradition of incising thin decorative lines and patterns in carved wood and filling with dark powders (charcoal, coal dust, coffee grounds, graphite, ground bark) or colored wax, etc. for contrast,. Kohlrosing dates back to at least Viking times.

Notable contemporary exponents include Judy Ritger (USA), Wille Sundqvist (Sweden)
and Jogge Sundqvist (Sweden)

References 

Woodworking techniques
Artistic techniques
Scandinavian culture